The St Lucia national cricket team represents the country of Saint Lucia in cricket. The team is a member of the Windward Islands Cricket Board of Control, which itself is a member association of the West Indies Cricket Board. Players from St Lucia generally represent the Windward Islands cricket team at domestic level and the West Indies at international level. St Lucia has however played as a separate entity in matches which held Twenty20 status (Stanford 20/20), but has not appeared in first-class or List A cricket. St Lucia competes with St Vincent & the Grenadines, Grenada and Dominica in domestic Windward Islands cricket competitions including the Windward Islands two-day and Twenty20 cricket championships. The team's captain, as of 2014, is Craig Emmanuel.

Notable players

International Players
Darren Sammy is St Lucia's most decorated player. He became the first St Lucian to represent the West Indies when he made his debut against New Zealand in an ODI match in 2004.  Sammy made his test debut against England in June 2007. A natural leader on the pitch, Sammy became West Indies captain in 2010.

Three players from Saint Lucia have represented the West Indies at International Level, Darren Sammy, Johnson Charles and Garey Mathurin.

 Apps denotes the number of appearances the player has made.
 Runs denotes the number of runs scored by the player.
 Wkts denotes the number of wickets taken by the player.

Many other St Lucian players have represented the Windward Islands domestically in the West Indies Regional Super50, Regional Four Day Competition and the Caribbean Twenty20.

St Lucia players on the current Windward Islands team
Darren Sammy
Johnson Charles
Garey Mathurin
Craig Emmanuel
Keddy Lesporis
Dalton Polius
Tarryck Gabriel

See also
List of Windward Islands first-class cricketers

Squad

Players with international caps are listed in bold.

source:
 St Lucia Squad - 2014
 St Lucia Squad - 2014
  St Lucia Squad - 2013

References

C
Cricket in Saint Lucia
Cricket teams in the West Indies